Methanobrevibacter thaueri is a species of methanogen archaeon, named after Rolf K. Thauer.

Description
Coccobacillus with slightly tapered ends, about 0.5 micrometres in width and 0.6-1.2 micrometres in length, occurring in pairs or short chains. Gram-positive reaction. Its cell walls are composed of pseudomurein. It is a strict anaerobe and its type strain is CWT (=DSM 11995T =OCM 817T). It was first isolated from cow faeces.

References

Further reading

External links
LPSN

Type strain of Methanobrevibacter thaueri at BacDive -  the Bacterial Diversity Metadatabase

Euryarchaeota
Archaea described in 2002